Trounson Kauri Park is a mainland island in the Northland Region of New Zealand. Characterised by its kauri trees, it was named after James Trounson, who gifted the forest to the Department of Conservation.

History 
Trounson Kauri Park and its surrounding farmland was heavily felled. Many people wanted the scenic remnants of kauri to be preserved. Sawmiller James Trounson added a further . Trounson Kauri Park was opened in 1921. It was then on ran as a 'Mainland Island'. An intensive pest control programme is restoring its biodiversity. Half of Trounson Kauri Park's trees are infected with kauri dieback.

Flora and fauna
Trounson Kauri Park is known for its kauri trees, which are common and increasing in the park. Other trees include rimu, kōwhai, pigeonwood and tōtara.

Native birds such as tūī, New Zealand pigeon, morepork, tomtit and grey warbler are common, whilst rarer birds such as North Island kākā and North Island kōkako persist in small numbers. Brown kiwi have the highest density population in Northland in the park thanks to the removal of most of the populations of rats, common brushtail possum and stoats.

See also
List of Kauri Parks in New Zealand

References

Protected areas of the Northland Region
Nature reserves in New Zealand
1921 establishments in New Zealand